Heavy Load is a 2008 British docudrama film directed by Jerry Rothwell.

The documentary tells the story of Heavy Load, a British punk band which includes disabled musicians. The film captures the band over two years, as they record their first album and take their show to bigger venues, and has been described by Mark Kermode as "a really, really fine music documentary".

Band members
 Simon Barker, vocals
 Jimmy Nichols, guitar and vocals
 Paul Richards, bass
 Mick Williams, guitar and vocals
 Michael White, drums

References

External links
 
 Independent Film Channel Heavy Load Page

2008 films
British documentary films
British independent films
Documentary films about punk music and musicians
Documentary films about people with disability
2008 documentary films
2000s English-language films
2000s British films
2008 independent films
English-language documentary films